Geirröðr (also Geirröd) is a jötunn in Norse mythology. He is the father of the  Gjálp and Greip, who are killed by the thunder-god Thor.

Geirröðr is mentioned in the skaldic poem Þórsdrápa, written by Eilíf Godrúnarson (late 10th c. AD), itself cited in Skáldskaparmál (early 13th c.) where it is preceded by Snorri Sturluson's account of the myth, and in Gesta Danorum by Saxo Grammaticus (early 13th c.).

Saturn's moon Geirrod is named after him.

Name 
The Old Norse name Geirröðr has been translated as 'spear-reddener'. It stems from the Old Norse masculine noun geirr ('spear'), ultimately from the Proto-Germanic *gaizaz ('spear, tip').

An unrelated figure also bears the name Geirröðr in the eddic poem Grímnismál.

Attestations

Prose Edda
In Skáldskaparmál (The Language of Poetry; early 13th c.), Loki is flying in Frigg’s hawk coat to Geirrödargardar, the abode of the giant Geirröðr, when he is captured by the latter and locked in a chest for three months. To redeem his life, Loki agrees to bring Thor to Geirröðr's place without his power belt and hammer. On their way to Geirrödargardar, Thor and Loki (or Thjálfi in Thórsdrápa) stop at the home of the giantess Gríðr. She warns Thor about Geirröðr's plan and equips him with a belt of strength, an iron glove, and a staff named Grídarvöl (Gríd’s-staff). Arriving at Geirrödargardar, Thor is eventually challenged to a game by Geirröðr. The giant throws a piece of red-hot iron at him, but Thor is able to catch it with the iron glove. As Geirröðr tries to hide behind a pillar, Thor throws the piece of iron through the column and kills him.

Viking Age 
The story is mentioned in Þórsdrápa (late 10th c. AD), cited in the later Skáldskaparmál.

Other texts 
In Gesta Danorum (early 13th c.), Thorkillus and his companions notice the pierced body of an old man and three dead women with their backs broken as they visit the vile hall of the dead Geruthus (Geirrøth). Thorkillus tells them that Thor had driven a hot ingot through Geruthus and killed his daughters with thunderbolts.

In Thorsteins þáttr baejarmagns, Thor's deeds have been reworked and transferred to a hero named Thorstein, involved in a sporting event at the hall of the giant-king Geirröd where a heavy red-hot seal’s head is thrown between the contestants.

Theories 
According to scholar John Lindow, the myth of Geirröðr "shows several characteristics of Thor stories—the dangerous journey to the otherworld, the special enmity of female giantesses, and the killing of a male giant—and it also introduces notions of smithing that sometimes seem to lurk behind Thor."

References

Bibliography

Further reading 

 Jörmungrund: Þórsdrápa Old Norse text with English translation and detailed analysis.

Jötnar